Róża (English: The Rose) is a 1936 Polish historical film directed by Józef Lejtes and starring Irena Eichlerówna, Witold Zacharewicz and Bogusław Samborski. It is based on a play by Stefan Żeromski. The filmmakers experimented with camera shots and the soundtrack in order to create a "visual poetry".

Cast
 Irena Eichlerówna - Krystyna 
 Witold Zacharewicz - Jan Czarowic 
 Bogusław Samborski - Benedykt Czarowic 
 Kazimierz Junosza-Stępowski - Police inspector 
 Lena Żelichowska - Maria 
 Stefan Jaracz - Oset 
 Michał Znicz - Anzelm 
 Dobiesław Damięcki - Dan 
 Mieczysław Cybulski - Grzegorz 
 Zofia Lindorf - Grzegorz's wife
 Stanisław Łapiński - Ślaz 
 Andrzej Szpaderski - Olek 
 Janek Wróblewski - Michałek 
 Stanisław Daniłowicz - Student 
 Jan Hajduga - Kuźma 
 Stefan Hnydziński - Soldier 
 Zdzisław Karczewski - Peasant 
 Julian Krzewiński - Peasant 
 Henryk Małkowski - Peasant

Bibliography
 Skaff, Sheila. The Law of the Looking Glass: Cinema in Poland, 1896-1939. Ohio University Press, 2008.

References

External links
 

1936 films
Polish historical drama films
1930s Polish-language films
Polish films based on plays
Films based on works by Stefan Żeromski
Polish black-and-white films
1930s historical drama films
1936 drama films